The Southern Tier League was a six–team Independent level baseball minor league that played in the 1904 and 1905 seasons. The Southern Tier League featured franchises based in New York and Pennsylvania. The Southern Tier League permanently folded after the 1905 season.

History
The Southern Tier League formed as Independent level minor league in 1904. The charter league members were the Addison White Sox, Corning White Ponies, Coudersport, Elmira, New York, Hornellsville Maple Cities, Penn Yan Grape Pickers and Wellsville Oil Drillers. League standings in some references list Hornellsville as the 1st place team, but August 20 newspaper accounts show Addison in 1st place with Harnellsville well behind in 5th place. The league was also referred to as the "Southern Tier Association."

The 1905 Southern Tier League continued play as a four–team Independent league. The four teams were the Addison-Wellsville Tobacco Strippers, Corning Glassblowers, Elmira and Hornellsville Bluebirds. The 1905 standings and statistics are unknown.

The Southern Tier League permanently folded as a minor league after the 1905 season. A league with the same name later played as a semi–pro league.

Southern Tier League teams

Southern Tier League overall standings
The 1904 and 1905 Southern Tier League records and statistics are unknown. The 1904 reported standings on August 20, 1904 are listed below. The 1905 standings are unknown.

1904 (standings from August 20, 1904)

Notable alumni
 Lee DeMontreville, Corning/Addison (1904-1905)

References

External links
Baseball Reference

Defunct minor baseball leagues in the United States
Baseball leagues in Pennsylvania
Defunct professional sports leagues in the United States
Sports leagues established in 1904
Sports leagues disestablished in 1905
Baseball leagues in New York (state)